Events in the year 1972 in Ireland.

Incumbents
 President: Éamon de Valera
 Taoiseach: Jack Lynch (FF)
 Tánaiste: Erskine H. Childers (FF)
 Minister for Finance: George Colley (FF)
 Chief Justice: Cearbhall Ó Dálaigh 
 Dáil: 19th
 Seanad: 12th

Events
 1 January – The Central Bank of Ireland became the banker of the Government of Ireland in succession to the Bank of Ireland in accordance with the Central Bank Act 1971, completing its transition from a currency board to a fully operating central bank.
 22 January – Taoiseach, Jack Lynch, and Minister for Foreign Affairs, Patrick Hillery, signed the Treaty of Accession to the European Communities.
 29 January – The annual broadcasting Jacob's Awards took place in Dublin.
 30 January – Bloody Sunday: Thirteen unarmed civilians were shot dead in Derry when British soldiers shot at civil rights marchers.
 31 January – The Taoiseach announced a national day of mourning following the events in Derry the previous day.
 1 February – Rioting took place in Dublin. The British Embassy in Merrion Square was burned.
 9 February – A day of disruption took place in Northern Ireland as people took to the streets in protest.
 10 February – The Irish Republican Army (IRA) announced a ceasefire.
 12 February – William Craig launched the Ulster Vanguard movement in Lisburn.
 19 February – The National Anti-European Economic Community (EEC) Committee organised a march along O'Connell Street in Dublin.
 26 February – Crowds turned out to see the footballer Pelé and his Brazilian club, Santos FC, play at Dalymount Park in Dublin.
 30 March – UK Prime Minister Edward Heath dissolved the Parliament of Northern Ireland and imposed Direct Rule over Northern Ireland.
 2 April – The Irish-language radio channel RTÉ Raidió na Gaeltachta commenced broadcasting.
 17 April – The government launched its European Economic Community referendum campaign to persuade citizens to join the EEC.
 5 May – The Regional Technical College, Carlow became the first Regional Technical College to install a computer. It was to be used for business and engineering courses; it used the Fortran and RPG languages and cost IR£10,000.
 10 May – In the referendum on Ireland's membership of the EEC the poll was almost five-to-one in favour.
 13 June – The Garda Síochána (police force) celebrated its 50th anniversary.
 6 July – Dmitri Shostakovich was presented with an honorary Doctor of Music (D.Mus.) degree at a ceremony in Trinity College Dublin.
 12 July – Over 2,000 refugees from Northern Ireland spent the marching season south of the Irish border.
 19 July – Muhammad Ali beat Alvin Lewis in a technical knockout during the 11th round of a boxing match at Croke Park in Dublin.
 21 July – Bloody Friday: Nine people died and over 100 were injured in a series of IRA explosions in Belfast city centre.
 31 July
 Operation Motorman, 4 am: The British Army began to regain control of the "no-go areas" established by Irish republican paramilitaries in Belfast, Derry (so-called "Free Derry") and Newry.
 Claudy bombing ("Bloody Monday"), 10 am: Three car bombs in Claudy, County Londonderry, killed nine people. It became public knowledge only in 2010 that a local Catholic priest was an IRA member believed to be involved in the bombings but his role was covered up by the authorities.
 20 August – Commemorations were held at Béal na Bláth, County Cork, to mark the 50th anniversary of the death of Michael Collins.
 1 December – Two bombs planted in Dublin by Ulster loyalists killed two men, George Bradshaw (30), a bus driver and Thomas Duffy (23), a bus conductor.
 25 September – The Darlington conference on the future of Northern Ireland opened.
 13 December – President Éamon de Valera signed documents covering Ireland's entry into the EEC.
 17 December – Police raided premises used by unlicensed station Radio Milinda in Dublin.

Arts and literature
 Hubert Butler's Ten Thousand Saints: A Study in Irish and European Origins was published.
 Seamus Deane's poetry Gradual Wars was published.
 Robert Dudley Edwards' A New History of Ireland was published.
 Poet Seamus Heaney moved from Belfast to work in Dublin and to live in County Wicklow; The Belfast Group of poets dissolved.
 Tom MacIntyre's play Eye Winker-Tom Tinker premièred at the Abbey Theatre in Dublin, directed by Lelia Doolan.
 John Montague's long poem The Rough Field was published.
 William Trevor's collection of stories The Ballroom of Romance was published.
 Gilbert O'Sullivan's song "Alone Again (Naturally)" reached number one in the U.S. singles chart.
 Horslips recorded and released their first album Happy to Meet – Sorry to Part.

Sports
 Olympics (Munich): Competing in the pentathlon, Mary Peters from Belfast became the first Irish woman to win a gold medal at the Olympic Games.

Births
 15 January – Mark Carroll, runner.
 17 January – John Byrne, cricketer.
 21 January – Derek McGrath, association football player.
 27 January – Keith Wood, former international rugby player.
 28 January – Peter McDonald, actor.
 February – Fergal Ryan, Cork hurler.
 4 February – Paul Anthony McDermott, English-born lawyer and academic (d. 2019)
 21 February – Turtle Bunbury, historian and author.
 27 February – Jason Byrne, comedian.
 22 March – Robin Banks, television presenter and radio disc jockey.
 10 April – Ed Byrne, comedian.
 17 April – Brian Morrisroe, association football player.
 20 May – Sharon Foley, athlete.
 31 May – Karl Geary, actor.
 16 June – Simon Coveney, Fine Gael party Teachta Dála (TD) representing Cork South-Central and Member of the European Parliament.
 24 June – Brendan Courtney, comedian and television presenter.
 2 July – Darren Shan, author.
 11 July – Cormac Battle, radio disc jockey.
 4 August – Joe Delaney, snooker player.
 6 August – Jason O'Mara, actor.
 12 August – Mark Kinsella, association football player and coach.
 15 August – Mikey Graham, singer.
 18 August – Barry Egan, Cork hurler.
 4 September – Willie Burke, association football player.
 8 September – Phil Laak, professional poker player.
 25 September – Emma Hannigan, author (d. 2018)
 9 October – John Carthy, shot dead in controversial circumstances in 2000 by the Garda Síochána after a 25-hour siege at his home.
 12 October – Yvonne McGuinness, visual artist
 15 October – Gary Murphy, golfer.
 1 December – David Higgins, golfer.
 6 December – Seán Sherlock, Labour Party TD for Cork East.
 14 December – Jason Barry, actor.
 15 December – Stuart Townsend, actor.
 30 December – Paul Keegan, association football player.

Full date unknown
 Duncan Campbell, video artist
 John Carney, film and television writer and director.
 Andy Comerford, Kilkenny hurler, manager.
 Arlene Hunt, novelist.
 Mark Landers, Cork hurler.
 Kevin Murray, Cork hurler.
 Jamesie O'Connor, Clare hurler.
 Joe Quaid, Limerick hurler.

Deaths
 11 January – Padraic Colum, poet, novelist, and dramatist (born 1881).
 18 January – Harry Colley, Fianna Fáil TD, Seanad (Senate) member (born 1891).
 22 February – Eva McGown, Official Hostess of Fairbanks and Honorary Hostess of Alaska (born 1883).
 26 April – Mark Deering, Fine Gael TD (born 1900).
 22 May – Cecil Day-Lewis, poet and writer, British Poet Laureate from 1967 to 1972, (born 1904).
 31 May – Alexander McCabe, Sinn Féin party member of parliament, member of First Dáil, Cumann na nGaedheal party TD (born 1886).
 c. June – Winifred Mary Letts, writer (born 1882 in England).
 19 June – John Blowick, co-founder St Columban's Foreign Mission Society (born 1888).
 1 September – Patricia Lynch, children's writer (born c.1894).
 29 September – Kathleen Clarke, widow of Republican leader Tom Clarke, Sinn Féin party member and later a Fianna Fáil TD, Seanad member, first female Lord Mayor of Dublin (born 1878).
 11 October – Wattie Dunphy, Kilkenny hurler (b. c1895).
 10 November – Charles Cuffe, cricketer (born 1914).

See also
 1972 in Irish television

References

 
1970s in Ireland
Ireland
Years of the 20th century in Ireland